Sveabreen is a glacier between Oscar II Land and James I Land at Spitsbergen, Svalbard.

References

Glaciers of Spitsbergen